St. Anthony Claret Parish is a Catholic parish in southeastern Fresno, California, in the San Joaquin Valley of Central California. 

The Claretian Missionaries began to minister to the Spanish- and English-speaking faithful in the suburban area of Fresno in 1951. During this year a temporary building was created that would eventually house the permanent building which now stands today. The church was the first to be named by the U.S. Claretians. Over time improvements were made and a site was purchased that would eventually house a permanent parish.

The parish is part of the official Roman Catholic Diocese of Fresno but the parish priests are assigned and directed by the Claretian U.S.A.-Canada Province based in Chicago, IL.

The parish boasts a strong growing Hispanic community, under the current direction of Rev. Fr. Art Gramaje, CMF with assistance of associate pastors Rev. Fr. Brian Culley, CMF and Rev. Jose Marino Novoa, CMF.

Priests who have served St. Anthony Claret Parish
Rev. Ron Alves, CMF
Rev. Cecil Barron, CMF
Rev. Robert J. Billett, CMF
Rev. Brian Culley, CMF
Rev. Tony Diaz, CMF
Rev. Dennis Gallo, CMF
Rev. Art Gramaje, CMF
Rev. Fred H. Leclaire, CMF
Rev. Henry J. Luna, CMF
Rev. Darrin Merlino, CMF
Rev. Quyen Nguyen, CMF
Rev. Anthony Okolo, CMF
Rev. Valentín Rámon, CMF
Rev. José Sánchez, CMF
Rev. Rosendo Urrabazo, CMF
Rev. Fernando Vega, CMF

External links
Parish Website
Claretian Missionaries of the U.S.A.-Canada
Diocese of Fresno official website

Anthony Mary Claret
Christian organizations established in 1951
Culture of Fresno, California
Churches in Fresno, California
Claretian churches in the United States
1951 establishments in California